Nasima Razmyar (born 13 September 1984 in Kabul, Afghanistan) is an Afghan-born Finnish politician, representing the Social Democratic Party. Razmyar was elected to the Finnish Parliament in 2015, gaining 5,156 votes in the elections. She served in the Parliament until June 2017, when she was chosen as the Deputy Mayor for culture and leisure in Helsinki. She has also been a member of the City Council of Helsinki since 2012.

Razmyar's family came to Finland from Moscow where her father Mohammad Daoud Razmyar served as the Ambassador of the Democratic Republic of Afghanistan to the Soviet Union. The family  moved to Finland in 1993, after then Afghan President Mohammad Najibullah was ousted from power. In 2010 Razmyar was named the Finnish Refugee Woman of the Year.

References

1984 births
Living people
People from Kabul
Politicians from Moscow
Politicians from Helsinki
Finnish people of Afghan descent
Finnish women bloggers
Finnish Muslims
Afghan Muslims
Afghan refugees
Afghan expatriates in Russia
Afghan expatriates in Finland
Afghan emigrants to Finland
Naturalized citizens of Finland
Finnish women in politics
Social Democratic Party of Finland politicians
Members of the Parliament of Finland (2015–19)
Women members of the Parliament of Finland
21st-century Finnish women politicians
Refugees in Finland